Denton Island is a major road junction near Denton in Greater Manchester.

It is a grade-separated roundabout which is both Junction 24 of the M60 motorway and the western terminus (Junction 1) of the M67 motorway. The A57 road also runs west from the junction into Manchester city centre, and east as slip roads to/from the M67 arm into Denton and towards Hyde.

Denton railway station is located underneath the M67 arm of the junction.

References

Road junctions in England
Motorway junctions in England
Denton, Greater Manchester